Milna is a village and a municipality on the western side of island of Brač; Split-Dalmatia County, Croatia.

Milna may also refer to:
Milna (Hvar), village at the island of Hvar, Croatia
Milna (Vis), village at the island of Vis, Croatia
Milna (volcano), a volcano on the Kuril Islands, Russia